Lamb Spring is a pre-Clovis prehistoric Paleo-Indian archaeological site located in Douglas County, Colorado with the largest collection of Columbian mammoth bones in the state.   Lamb Spring also provides evidence of Paleo-Indian hunting in a later period by the Cody culture complex group.  Lamb Spring was listed in 1997 on the National Register of Historic Places.

History

Paleo-Indians
Paleo-Indian were primarily hunters of large mammals called megafauna, such as the Bison antiquus, during a transitional period from Ice Age to Ice Age summer.  As the climate warmed, glacial run-off created lakes and savannas.  At the end of the summer period the land became drier, food was not as abundant for large animals, and they became extinct.  People adapted by hunting smaller mammals and gathering wild plants to supplement their diet.

Lamb Spring was an early to late Paleo-Indian site in Colorado, with Megafauna bison antiquus, camelops, mammoth and horse remains.

Mammoth bones at the Lamb Spring site may pre-date the earliest known human culture, the Clovis culture, which flourished 11,000-13,000 years ago.  Mammoth bones at the site are dated at 11,735 +/- 95 years ago and 13,140 +/- 1,000 years ago.  Many large bones appear to have been broken at the site, which may indicate butchery by early man.  There were also some broken rocks with the bones, but it has not been determined that they were used as tools. It has not yet been conclusively determined to be a pre-Clovis site, but continued excavation may find pre-Clovis tools and evidence that more conclusively finds that the mammoth died as a result of hunting.

The camelop bones and artifacts date back to about 11,000 BC. The site has Colorado's largest collection of Columbian mammoth bones.  Pronghorn and rodent remains were also found. After 11,000 BC the climate changed and all of the megafauna except the bison antiquus were extinct.  About 7000 or 6500 BC, Paleo-Indians hunted bison and smaller mammals at the spring.

Discovery
In the summer of 1960, while constructing a pond at a spring on his property, Charles Lamb found mammoth tusks and bones from about 13,000 years ago.  Also found were bison, camel, and horse bones. His find quickly initiated a series of archaeological investigations and excavations.

Archaeological findings
A summary of archaeological efforts are:

Artifacts from the archaeological excavations are located at the Denver Museum of Nature and Science and the National Museum of Natural History in Washington, D.C.

Lamb Spring Archaeological Preserve
The 32 acres around the Lamb Spring site was purchased by The Archaeological Conservancy in 1995.  Assisting them in the acquisition were the Denver Museum of Nature and Science, Douglas County, Colorado and the Smithsonian Institution. Free tours are available, May through October, on the 1st Saturday of the month.  The tours are sponsored by the Conservancy and the Douglas County Community Planning and Sustainable Development department.

See also
National Register of Historic Places listings in Douglas County, Colorado
 List of prehistoric sites in Colorado

References

Further reading
 Fisher, Jr., John W. N.D. Observations on the Late Pleistocene Bone Bed Assemblage from the Lamb Spring Site, Colorado.  In Ice Age Hunters of the Rockies by Dennis Stanford and Jane S. Day, pp. 51–81.  Denver Museum of Natural History; Niwot: University Press of Colorado, 1992.
Gibbon, Guy E., and Kenneth M. Ames.  'Archaeology of Prehistoric Native America: An Encyclopedia.  1998. .
 Mandryk, Carole A.S. "A geoarchaeological interpretation of the Lamb Spring Site, Colorado." Geoarchaeology. Vol13, (8):819–846, 1998
 Rancier, Jim. (1981) Field Note from Smithsonian Institution Excavations at Lamb Spring Site.  On file at University of Colorado Museum and Field Studies Program.
 Scott, Glenn R. N.D. Geology of the Lamb Spring Site. Denver, Colorado: United States Geological Survey.
 Stanford, Dennis J.; Wedel, Waldo R.; Scott, Glenn R. (1981). Archaeological Investigations of the Lamb Spring Site. Southwestern Lore 47(1) March 1981 pp. 14-27.
 Stanford, Dennis J.; Fisher, Jr., John W. (1992) Analysis of the Lamb Spring Archaeological Site.'' Smithsonian Institution Scholarly Studies Program.  On file at University of Colorado Museum of Field Studies Program.

External links
 Lamb Spring Archaeological Preserve

Archaeological sites on the National Register of Historic Places in Colorado
Paleo-Indian archaeological sites in Colorado
Protected areas of Douglas County, Colorado
Pre-Clovis archaeological sites in the Americas
National Register of Historic Places in Douglas County, Colorado